Novyye Turbasly (Yañı Turbaślı) is a rural locality (a village) in Tugaysky Selsoviet, Blagoveshchensky District, Bashkortostan, Russia. The population was 51 as of 2010. There are 2 streets.

Geography 
Novyye Turbasly is located 30 km south of Blagoveshchensk (the district's administrative centre) by road. Tugay is the nearest rural locality.

References 

Rural localities in Blagoveshchensky District